Nermin Zolotić (born 7 July 1993) is a Bosnian professional footballer who plays as a defender for Portuguese Primeira Liga club Casa Pia.

Club career
Born in Sarajevo, Zolotić spent four seasons with hometown club Željezničar in the Bosnian Premier League before joining Gent in 2014. He made his Belgian Pro League debut on 26 July 2014 against Cercle Brugge.

Zolotić joined Croatian side Istra 1961 on loan in August 2015. After his loan spell at Istra 1961, he was loaned to Željezničar for the remainder of the 2015–16 season.

In 2020, Zolotić signed for Portuguese side Casa Pia following his departure from Roeselare.

Honours
Željezničar
Bosnian Premier League: 2011–12, 2012–13
Bosnian Cup: 2010–11, 2011–12

Gent
Belgian Pro League: 2014–15
Belgian Super Cup: 2015

References

External links

1993 births
Living people
Footballers from Sarajevo
Association football forwards
Bosnia and Herzegovina footballers
Bosnia and Herzegovina youth international footballers
Bosnia and Herzegovina under-21 international footballers
FK Željezničar Sarajevo players
K.A.A. Gent players
NK Istra 1961 players
K.S.V. Roeselare players
Casa Pia A.C. players
Premier League of Bosnia and Herzegovina players
Belgian Pro League players
Croatian Football League players
Challenger Pro League players
Liga Portugal 2 players
Primeira Liga players
Bosnia and Herzegovina expatriate footballers
Expatriate footballers in Croatia
Bosnia and Herzegovina expatriate sportspeople in Croatia
Expatriate footballers in Belgium
Bosnia and Herzegovina expatriate sportspeople in Belgium
Expatriate footballers in Portugal
Bosnia and Herzegovina expatriate sportspeople in Portugal